Loda is a village in Loda Township, Iroquois County, Illinois, United States. As of the 2010 census its population was 407.

History
A post office called Loda has been in operation since 1880. The village derives its name from "Cath-Loda", a poem by Ossian.

Geography
Loda is located in southwestern Iroquois County at  (40.516400, -88.073975). U.S. Route 45 passes through the center of the village, leading north  to Buckley and south  to Paxton. Interstate 57 passes through the west side of Loda, but with no direct access.

Bayles Lake is a freshwater reservoir located just west of Loda. The lake is an impoundment of Spring Creek, a north-flowing tributary of the Iroquois River, part of the Kankakee River watershed.

Demographics

As of the census of 2000, there were 419 people, 166 households, and 111 families residing in the village. The racial makeup of the village was 94.03% White, 2.63% African American, 2.15% from other races, and 1.19% from two or more races. Hispanic or Latino of any race were 5.49% of the population.

There were 166 households, out of which 30.7% had children under the age of 18 living with them, 54.2% were married couples living together, 9.6% had a female householder with no husband present, and 33.1% were non-families. 30.1% of all households were made up of individuals, and 16.3% had someone living alone who was 65 years of age or older.  The average household size was 2.52 and the average family size was 3.20.

In the village, the population was spread out, with 26.5% under the age of 18, 9.1% from 18 to 24, 24.6% from 25 to 44, 24.1% from 45 to 64, and 15.8% who were 65 years of age or older.  The median age was 40 years. For every 100 females there were 94.9 males.  For every 100 females age 18 and over, there were 102.6 males.

The median income for a household in the village was $36,625, and the median income for a family was $42,708. Males had a median income of $32,750 versus $19,250 for females. The per capita income for the village was $18,877.  About 8.5% of families and 16.0% of the population were below the poverty line, including 27.8% of those under age 18 and 11.3% of those age 65 or over.

Notable people 
Notable people associated with the village include:

 Irene L. Beland, nursing educator
 Robert D. Foster, physician and early member of the Latter Day Saint movement
 Hugh Doak Rankin, artist

References

External links
Village of Loda official website

Villages in Iroquois County, Illinois